Ethalia gilchristae is a species of sea snail, a marine gastropod mollusk in the family Trochidae, the top snails.

Distribution
This marine species occurs off South Africa.

References

External links
 To World Register of Marine Species

gilchristae
Gastropods described in 1992